The Herald-Banner is a five-day morning daily newspaper published in Greenville, Texas, covering Hunt County. It does not publish a Sunday or Monday edition.

The newspaper is published by Community Newspaper Holdings. The Herald-Banner also publishes two weekly newspapers: the Rockwall County Herald-Banner and Royse City Herald-Banner.

History 
John C. Bayne began publishing The Herald, a weekly newspaper, in Hunt County in 1869. In 1890, the daily Morning Herald was begun under editor Edwin W. Harris, publishing alongside the weekly newspaper. The two newspapers would eventually merge under the Morning Herald ownership of the W.C. Poole family.

Another Bayne paper, the Independent (est. 1875), was renamed the  Independent Banner when J.F. Mitchell bought it from Bayne in 1882. It became a daily named the Evening Banner in 1894 under the ownership of R.C. Dial, who sold the property to Fred Horton in 1907.

Harte-Hanks Newspapers bought the Evening Banner from the Horton family in 1954, sparking a competition between the crosstown Banner and Herald. After two years, the company bought the Morning Herald from the Poole family in 1956, merging the two papers as the Herald-Banner. A court case followed, with Harte-Hanks accused of unfair competition; the chain was acquitted of the charges.

Harte-Hanks sold the newspaper to Worrell Enterprises in 1988. The American Publishing Company (later Hollinger International) purchased the paper from Worrell in 1991. Hollinger sold the paper to Community Newspaper Holdings in 2000.

References 

Greenville Herald-Banner, Handbook of Texas online
Company sells four newspapers, Associated Press
Greenville Herald Banner, Texas Press Association
United States v. Harte-Hanks Newspapers

External links 
 Herald-Banner Website

Hunt County, Texas
Daily newspapers published in Texas